Hieu Minh Trinh is a professor in control systems engineering at Deakin University, Australia.

Hieu Trinh was born in Vietnam. In the early 1980s, he came to Australia as a refugee. He attended University of Melbourne from which he got his BEng (Hons), MEngSc, PhD degrees in electrical and electronic engineering in 1990, 1992 and 1996 respectively. Following his postdoctoral fellowship, he served as a lecturer at James Cook University until 2000. In January 2001, he joined Deakin University, where he currently serves as a full professor.

Hieu's research is focused on the development of fundamental theories of control systems. Through the rigor of mathematical theories, he and his collaborators solve control problems of vital importance to nonlinear systems and interconnected systems. Hieu has made significant and sustained contributions to research. So far, he has published one research book, three book chapters, and over 200 research papers on topics related to control and systems theories and their application to real-life systems. Hieu is also committed to transferring his knowledge of control engineering to the next generation of quality engineers and researchers at Deakin University.

References

External links

Living people
Australian engineers
Vietnamese engineers
University of Melbourne alumni
Academic staff of James Cook University
Academic staff of Deakin University
Vietnamese people
Year of birth missing (living people)